Roby Mill is a village in the West Lancashire district of Lancashire, England. The estimated population is 405.

Geography and Politics
Roby Mill is located in the West Lancashire district of Lancashire, and the civil parish of Up Holland, formerly part of the unparished area of Skelmersdale.

It falls under West Lancashire Borough Council and Lancashire County Council, both of which are responsible for the administration of various services in the area. It is located in the Wrightington ward of West Lancashire Borough Council, where it is represented by two Conservative Party councillors and in the Skelmersdale North ward of Lancashire County Council, where it is represented by one Labour Party councillor.

It has been represented since the 2005 general election by Labour Party MP Rosie Cooper.

Transport

Preston Bus operates the 312 service which runs through the village, connecting the Concourse Shopping Centre in Skelmersdale to Wrightington Hospital.

Education
The village is served by one Church of England primary school.

References

Villages in Lancashire
Geography of the Borough of West Lancashire